Vineuil Sports Football is a French association football club founded in 1965. They are based in the town of Vineuil, Loir-et-Cher and their home stadium is the Stade Municipal which has a capacity of approximately 1,100 spectators. As of the 2009–10 season, the club plays in the Régional, the seventh tier of French football.

External links
Vineuil SF official website 

Football clubs in France
Association football clubs established in 1965
1965 establishments in France
Sport in Loir-et-Cher
Football clubs in Centre-Val de Loire